Anders Ljungberg (born 12 July 1947) is a Swedish former footballer who played as a midfielder. He was nicknamed "Puskas" after the Hungarian footballer of the same name.

Club career
Ljungberg is most known for being part of the Malmö FF team that reached the 1979 European Cup Final. He won five national championships and six cup titles during his time with Malmö.

Coach career
Ljungberg was coach of Landskrona BoIS from 1995 to 1996.

Personal life
Today, Ljungberg is an upper secondary school teacher in Trelleborg, Sweden.

References

1947 births
Living people
Swedish footballers
Sweden international footballers
Malmö FF players
Åtvidabergs FF players
IF Limhamn Bunkeflo (men) players
Landskrona BoIS players
Örebro SK players
Allsvenskan players
Swedish football managers
Landskrona BoIS managers
Association football midfielders